Zenith is an unincorporated community in Fentress County, Tennessee, United States.

Notes

Unincorporated communities in Fentress County, Tennessee
Unincorporated communities in Tennessee